The North Carolina Council of State election of 1996 was held on 5 November 1996, to elect the Council of State.  On the same day, North Carolina held elections for Governor and for Lieutenant Governor, who also formally sit in the Council of State.

All the races were won by Democrats, as were the posts of governor and lieutenant governor. All were incumbents except for Elaine Marshall, who won the post of secretary of state, and Michael E. Ward, who was elected Superintendent of Public Instruction. Both Marshall and Ward succeeded fellow Democrats.

Results by office

Attorney General

State Auditor

Commissioner of Agriculture

Commissioner of Insurance

Commissioner of Labor

Secretary of State

Superintendent of Public Instruction

State Treasurer

Footnotes

Lieutenant Governor
1996
North Carolina Council of State